Hypsopygia suffusalis is a species of snout moth in the genus Hypsopygia. It was described by Francis Walker in 1866 and is known from India.

References

Moths described in 1866
Pyralini